The 2010 Cafés do Brasil Indy 300 was an IndyCar motor race held in front of approximately 14,000 people on October 2, 2010, at the Homestead–Miami Speedway in Homestead, Florida. It was the 17th and final showdown of the 2010 IndyCar Series, the final annual edition of the event in the IndyCar Series, and the 15th anniversary of the running of the race (including five years in the Championship Auto Racing Teams (CART) schedule). Chip Ganassi Racing driver Scott Dixon, who started from the second position, won the 200-lap race. Andretti Autosport's Danica Patrick finished second and her teammate Tony Kanaan took third.

Dixon's teammate Dario Franchitti won the pole position by posting the fastest two-lap effort in qualifying. He led the first 42 laps until Ryan Briscoe passed him on lap 43 but retook the position on the next lap. Franchitti led for a total of 128 laps, more than any other driver. He later opted to drive conservatively after his championship rival Will Power crashed in an unsuccessful attempt to lap Ryan Hunter-Reay on the 135th lap. Dixon took the lead on lap 152, and led a total of 47 laps en route to his third victory of the season — the 24th of his career. Patrick, one of five women drivers competing in the event, held off her teammate Kanaan in the final five laps to finish second by 0.0011 seconds.

There were five cautions and an event record-breaking 18 lead changes among seven drivers during the race. The result of the race won Franchitti the third Drivers' Championship of his career and the fourth for Chip Ganassi Racing from finishing eighth. Power's non-finish put him five points behind Franchitti in second place, while Dixon overtook Hélio Castroneves for third, and Briscoe finished the season in fifth place.

Background

The Cafés do Brasil Indy 300 was confirmed as part of the Indy Racing League's (IRL) 2010 schedule for the IndyCar Series in July 2009. It was the tenth consecutive year the race was held in the series, and the 15th running of the Cafés do Brasil Indy 300, counting the period from 1996 to 2000 when it was a Championship Auto Racing Teams (CART) event. The Cafés do Brasil Indy 300 was the 17th (and final) race scheduled for 2010 by the IRL, and was held on October 2, 2010, in Homestead, Florida, at Homestead–Miami Speedway. It was the second round held in Florida, following the Honda Grand Prix of St. Petersburg in March. Tire supplier Firestone brought three types of tire to the race: two dry compounds (black-sidewall "Primary" and red-banded "Alternate") and grooved rain tires.

At this late stage of the season, Team Penske driver Will Power was the points leader with 587 points, with Dario Franchitti 12 points behind in second. Hélio Castroneves was third with 501 points; Scott Dixon was fourth, and Ryan Briscoe was fifth. 53 points were available for the season's final round which meant Franchitti could win the championship. In the event the two drivers were tied on points, Power would be the champion having won five races to Franchitti's three. Franchitti needed to score 13 more points than Power to win the title.

After finishing third at the previous round in Motegi, Japan, Power said he was confident he could approach the final race more aggressively and believed it was the first time in his career he had the necessary equipment to win races, and was in a position to do so on oval tracks. Franchitti, who was familiar with Homestead-Miami Speedway, revealed he would not alter his plan and went to the track to win the race; he acknowledged that eliminating the 13-point deficit would not be easy. He also noted the high number of entries for the race had the potential to affect the championship battle, "I think the other guys on the track, they've got their own reasons. They're trying to win the race the same as any other race. And as long as I think they race with the same respect that they have all season, then I think we'll be OK. There's a couple of cars that I think really ... certainly one that's difficult enough to run a consistent lane. So I don't think you can expect much more."

On September 8, IndyCar Chief Executive Officer Randy Bernard announced via e-mail that Homestead–Miami Speedway would not hold a race in 2011. While he praised the track, the objectives of the track's owners and the series were "not aligned", and the IRL elected to omit Homestead-Miami Speedway from its calendar. The Miami Herald reported the track appeared to suffer management-wise because it was owned and operated by International Speedway Corporation which had three other circuits expected for removal from the 2011 season. Homestead–Miami Speedway's president Matthew Becherer said that he wanted the IndyCar race to remain, but could not do so after the series raised the event's sanctioning fee by 30 percent. Bernard said while the series was receptive to returning to the track in the future, he blamed the organizers for failing to promote IndyCar.

There were two driver changes for the race. Dreyer & Reinbold Racing announced eight days beforehand that Ana Beatriz would fill in for regular driver Mike Conway in the team's  24 car. Conway had been able to return to full fitness following a major accident in the Indianapolis 500 in May but chose not to compete at Homestead–Miami Speedway because he wanted to regain his strength and focus on the 2011 season. It was Beatriz's fourth race of the season having previously taken part in the rounds at São Paulo, Indianapolis and Chicago. She was one of five women to compete in the event along with Danica Patrick, Sarah Fisher, Simona de Silvestro and Milka Duno. Conquest Racing employed Indy Lights driver and Formula BMW race winner Sebastián Saavedra to drive their No. 36 car, becoming the sixth person to race for the team in 2010.

Practice and qualifying

There were two practice sessions on the Saturday preceding the race; the first ran for 60 minutes and the second 30 minutes. Power was fastest in the first practice session with a lap of 25.0824 seconds; Dixon, Briscoe, Franchitti, Castroneves, Dan Wheldon, Marco Andretti, Alex Tagliani, Vítor Meira and Tony Kanaan made up positions two to ten. A caution flag was shown late in the session for a track inspection.

Two hours and 15 minutes after the first practice session ended, the 27 drivers determined the starting grid through qualifying. Each driver ran two laps, with both attempts added together to form a combined two-lap effort from each participant. The starting order was determined by the competitors' fastest lap times. The driver who won the pole position earned one point towards the drivers' standings. Franchitti clinched his second pole position of the season and the 13th of his career with a two-lap effort of 50.1532 seconds. He was joined on the grid's front row by Dixon. Power, who held the pole position for most of qualifying until Franchitti's lap, was third, his teammate Briscoe took fourth and Wheldon fifth. Justin Wilson, Ed Carpenter, Kanaan, Takuma Sato and Castroneves were in positions six to ten. Behind them, the rest of the grid lined up as: Patrick, E. J. Viso, Mario Moraes, Bertrand Baguette, Beatriz, Andretti, Fisher, Graham Rahal, Tagliani, Ryan Hunter-Reay, Vítor Meira, Alex Lloyd, Raphael Matos, Saavedra, de Silvestro, Hideki Mutoh, and Duno. After qualifying, Franchitti said, "I don’t know what (crew chief) Chris Simmons did to the Target car between practice and now, but that thing was beautifully balanced. (After the first timed lap) it felt like a good lap, and I looked down and saw 213 and said: 'Oh, nice. Let’s see if we can not screw up the second lap.' I felt it; I was able to take the line I wanted. Now I can relax a little."

The second practice was held at night and Briscoe led with a lap of 25.3160 seconds. His Penske Racing teammate Castroneves was 0.0794 seconds slower in second place; Matos improved on his qualifying performance to finish third. Franchitti was fourth; Wheldon replicated his qualifying result in fifth position. The top ten was rounded out by Patrick, Power, Dixon, Tagliani, and Andretti.

Qualifying classification

Race
The race began at 19:00 PM Eastern Daylight Time (UTC+04:00), and was televised live on Versus. Approximately 14,000 spectators were in attendance. The weather at the start was clear and mild. The command to start engines was given by Castroneves and Kanaan in the pit lane. When the race commenced from its rolling start, Franchitti maintained his pole position advantage going into the first turn. His teammate Dixon tucked into his teammate's slipstream; the two could not break away from the rest of the field. Castroneves moved from tenth to fifth by the start of lap ten, while his fellow Brazilian Kanaan gained three positions to run in third as Power fell back. Franchitti encountered slower traffic as Kanaan overtook Dixon for second. The first caution was necessitated on the 36th lap; Moraes stopped with a mechanical fault in an unsafe section of the track in turn two. During the caution, several drivers, elected to make their first pit stops.

Power reported steering problems, which were rectified in his pit box. Kanaan's vehicle appeared to stutter exiting his pit box; he avoided stalling as he swerved to avoid hitting a car that stopped ahead of him. The delay dropped him to fifth. Franchitti kept his lead at the restart on lap 42, followed by Briscoe in second place. On the following lap, Franchitti maintained his position on the left as Briscoe used his push-to-pass system to overtake him for the lead. Briscoe lost the position to Franchitti on lap 44; he kept it until Briscoe passed him again to reclaim first place. The event's second caution was waved on the 45th lap for an accident at turn four. Beatriz exited the pit lane late and slowed on the low part of the apron to allow the field through. Doing this prompted some drivers such as Patrick to scramble for space to avoid striking her car. As the field passed her, she accelerated up the bumpy asphalt surface, losing downforce and traction at the rear of her car. That caused Beatriz to collide with the outside wall at turn four. Her damaged car drifted down the track, and below the white line denoting the circuit's boundaries.

Most of the field, except for de Silvestro, Tagliani, Wilson, Mutoh, and Fisher, remained on the track during the caution. Franchitti again led at the restart on lap 52, with Briscoe in second. Briscoe and Franchitti clashed wheels in a battle for the lead that they exchanged all round the circuit. At this point, Kanaan was the fastest driver, overtaking Dixon and Castroneves to move to third position. He was soon in a three-way battle for first with Franchitti and Briscoe. Franchitti slowed slightly on lap 58 because his tires were possibly strained from maintaining a tight line on the right, allowing Briscoe into the lead. Two laps later, Kanaan and Dixon got ahead of Franchitti as he lost momentum and clear air from his earlier battle with Briscoe. Further down the order, Power overhauled Patrick in a battle for seventh position, and he later passed Wheldon to for sixth. Dixon passed Kanaan and Briscoe on the 62nd lap to take the lead. Seven laps later, Kanaan passed Dixon for the lead. Franchitti returned to full speed, overtaking Briscoe and Dixon for second. He then passed Kanaan on the left to reclaim the lead on lap 73.

Franchitti increased his advantage to half a second as his car's handling seemed to come back in his favor. During this period, Power moved to fourth place. Wheldon and Briscoe made green flag pit stops for fuel and tires on lap 90. Franchitti, Kanaan and Power made their stops six laps later. In the meantime, the fuel hose on Viso's car was observed landing in the infield grass. No caution was needed since it was retrieved without trouble. After the pit stops, Franchitti returned to the lead, closely followed by Kanaan, Dixon, Power, Briscoe, and Castroneves. Franchitti held off Kanaan to earn two additional points for leading the most laps of any driver at the completion of lap 118. This meant Franchitti now had to win, and for Power to place fourth, to give him the Drivers' Championship. Lap 135 saw the third caution: Power slid into a right-hand side barrier leaving turn four after a failed attempt to lap Hunter-Reay's slower car to his right. His rear-right suspension wishbone bent, and he spent a few laps driving slowly, before entering pit road; he had difficulty lining up correctly in his pit box.

Power's mechanics instructed him to switch off the engine, and he was taken behind the pit wall for five minutes and six seconds, losing five laps to Franchitti. This now required Franchitti to finish at least tenth to win the Drivers' Championship as he elected to conserve fuel. Kanaan's fuel hose was still attached to his car when he left his pit stall, striking some members of his pit crew. He incurred a drive-through penalty that he took on lap 141; it dropped him to the back of the lead lap. One of the sidelights informing drivers when the pit lane was open required attention as Meira, Patrick and Kanaan made fuel stops to attempt to manage their usage over the last 50 laps. Racing resumed on lap 151 with Franchitti leading Dixon and Andretti. Dixon took the lead on lap 152 and was later challenged by Andretti to his right. When Andretti failed, he steered left, and passed Dixon for first on lap 158. Franchitti dropped to fourth when the fourth caution came out on lap 166 after an endplate from an unidentified car was located on the circuit. The caution provided some teams with an opportunity to make a final pit stop to allow their drivers to finish the race. On the next lap, Chip Ganassi Racing elected to alter their strategy. They asked Franchitti to enter the pit lane for fuel and tires, while Dixon stayed on the track.

Dixon, Castroneves, Kanaan, Patrick, Wheldon and Meira chose not to make another pit stop and Dixon led at the lap-172 restart. However, the restart was delayed twice to lap 174 because of consecutive false starts. Lap 176 saw the fifth (and final) caution: Duno spun up the track and into a barrier. This caused Franchitti to slow to narrowly avoid ramming into her car; he fell to ninth. The green flag was waved on lap 183. Dixon pulled away, while Castroneves could not match the speed of the two Andretti Autosport cars of Kanaan and the aggressive Patrick, and fell to fourth. Dixon, unhindered, took his third victory of the season and the 24th of his career. Patrick was faster than her teammate Kanaan leaving turn two, and she took second by 0.0011 seconds. Briscoe, Castroneves, Meira and Andretti were fourth to seventh. Franchitti finished eighth to win his third Drivers' Championship and the fourth for Chip Ganassi Racing. Wheldon and Rahal rounded out the top ten. Hunter-Reay took 11th, and Lloyd won the Rookie of the Year award by finishing 12th. The final finishers were Carpenter, Tagliani, Baugette, Saavedra, Matos, Sato, Viso, Mutoh, Wilson, Fisher, and de Silvestro. There was an event-record eighteen lead changes amongst seven drivers. Franchitti's 128 laps led was the most of any driver. His teammate Dixon led five times for a total of 47 laps.

Post-race

Dixon appeared in victory lane to celebrate his third win of the season in front of the crowd; the win earned him $272,500. He said of his victory, "This is exactly what we needed to end the season. We could see early on that Will [Power] was struggling and we set our strategy up after that. We were close on fuel until that last yellow, but we had the speed all night. It was a great race for the entire team, and I'm happy for Chip [Ganassi], Dario [Franchitti] and the entire organization." Patrick spoke of her feeling that finishing second was like a win to her, "This was a great way to end the season. We have had our high points and low points and the GoDaddy crew pulled it together for a strong end to the year. Hopefully we can continue to improve the car to be better for next year." Third-placed Kanaan said he did not observe Patrick in his rear-view mirrors. Nevertheless, he was happy with his performance notwithstanding a drive-through penalty. "Putting on a good show was the least we could do for the fans here tonight. I have to thank my crew. We had a moment there, but when we have a good car, it makes my life a whole lot easier. It was a good weekend as a team. I'm looking forward to next year."

Afterward, Franchitti began celebrating the third IndyCar Drivers' Championship of his career. During the celebrations, he said of his success: "Look back to the start of 2007, I hadn’t won a championship. Won a lot of races, not a championship or Indy 500. Now we find ourselves with two 500s and three championships. I’m just going to enjoy it. I think I’m just going to let it sink in, enjoy it. And if you ask me that question maybe starting next year I’ll give you a better answer. But I’m very proud of the achievement. And it’s an absolute honor to get to drive for the Target team. And the equipment they give me. And that feeling of success is great." Power said while he was disappointed not to win the championship, he wanted to come back stronger for the 2011 season after he had not won his first race on an oval track and lost a potential victory at Chicagoland due to a malfunctioning fuel hose. "Like I predicted at the beginning of the season, it was the guy and the team who made the least amount of mistakes that won the championship. But next year I'll come back really strong." Franchitti congratulated Power for the competition he provided and Patrick applauded the Australian.

Because he finished eighth, Franchitti won the Drivers' Championship by five points over Power in second position. With 547 points, Dixon's victory secured him third while Castroneves' fifth-place result dropped him to fourth position with 531 points. Briscoe ended the year in fifth position with 482 points after finishing fourth in the event.

Race classification

Standings after the race

 Note: Only the top five positions are included for the drivers' standings.

References

Cafes do Brasil Indy 300
Cafes do Brasil Indy 300
Cafes do Brasil Indy 300
Homestead–Miami Indy 300